Denis Carey may refer to:

Denis Carey (actor) (1909–1986), British actor
Denis Carey (athlete) (1872–?), Irish track and field athlete
Denis Carey (composer), Irish musician and composer
D. J. Carey (born 1970), hurler